Heart of My Own is the second full-length album by Canadian singer-songwriter Basia Bulat, released on January 26, 2010, on Secret City Records. The tracks "Gold Rush" and "Run" were released as singles to promote the album.

Track listing
 "Go On"
 "Run"
 "Sugar and Spice"
 "Gold Rush"
 "Heart of My Own"
 "Sparrow"
 "If Only You"
 "I'm Forgetting Everyone"
 "The Shore"
 "Once More, for the Dollhouse"
 "Walk You Down"
 "If It Rains"
 "Hush" (Bonus Track)

Critical reception

The album received a fair amount of favourable reviews, as indicated by the aggregate score of 72 at Metacritic.

The album was a longlisted nominee for the 2010 Polaris Music Prize.

Heart of My Own was awarded the second spot in Exclaim!'s 2010 Folk & Country Year in Review music rankings. The album was praised for the rumbling, rollicking edge in many of its songs, "The arresting vocal and autoharp simplicity of "The Shore" demonstrates the fundamental talent at work, one so transcendent that it hints at a timeless soulfulness that Bulat is still at the outset of channelling."

References

2010 albums
Basia Bulat albums
Secret City Records albums
Albums produced by Howard Bilerman